Fetch may refer to:

Books
 Fetch, a 2012 book by Alan MacDonald and David Roberts
 The Fetch, a 2006 book by Chris Humphreys
 The Fetch, a 2009 book by Laura Whitcomb
 The Fetch, a 1991 book by Robert Holdstock
 Fazbear Frights #2: Fetch, a 2019 book by Scott Cawthon

Music
 Fetch, a 2012 album by Moritz von Oswald Trio
 Fetch (album), a 2013 album by Melt-Banana
 The Fetch (album), a 2015 album by Linda Hoyle
 The Fetch, a 1981 album by Paul Lovens
 "The Fetch", song by Linda Hoyle from The Fetch

Other
 Wind fetch The length that wind can blow unobstructed over water 
 Fetch TV, an Australian IPTV provider
 Fetch (folklore), a doppelgänger or double in Irish folklore
 Fetch (FTP client), a software FTP client
 Fetch (game), a game played between a human and a pet in which the human throws an object for the pet to retrieve
 Fetch (geography), the length of water over which a given wind has blown
 Fetch! with Ruff Ruffman, a children's animated television series
 Fetch-execute cycle, a typical sequence of computer machine actions
 Fetch API, see XMLHttpRequest#Fetch alternative, a Javascript API for retrieving internet resources
 Abigail "Fetch" Walker, a character from the inFAMOUS video game series